Patrick Karl Kruse (born 30 November 1953) is an English former professional footballer who is best remembered for his five-year spell in the Football League with Brentford, for whom he made over 200 appearances as a centre back. Kruse is known for scoring what is believed to be the fastest own goal of all time, netting past his own keeper after just six seconds of play in a match in January 1977.

Career

Arlesey Town 
A centre back, Kruse began his career at hometown South Midlands League Premier Division club Arlesey Town. He departed in June 1970.

Leicester City 
Kruse secured a move to the top tier of English football in June 1970 when he signed for the club he supports, Leicester City. He had to wait over two years to make his professional debut for the Foxes, which came with a start in a 1–0 defeat to Tottenham Hotspur on 27 April 1974. Owing to Malcolm Munro's injury, he filled in again two days later versus Norwich City, this time helping Leicester to a clean sheet in a 3–0 win. Kruse failed to make another first team appearance for the Foxes and moved to Fourth Division club Mansfield Town on loan in September 1974. He departed Filbert Street at the end of the 1974–75 season.

Torquay United 
Kruse linked up with former Leicester City assistant manager Malcolm Musgrove to sign for Fourth Division club Torquay United on loan in March 1975. He made 10 appearances during the remainder of the 1974–75 season and signed permanently at the end of the campaign. Kruse established himself in the team the following season and won the club's Player of the Year award. The most memorable event of Kruse's time with Torquay came in a match versus Cambridge United in January 1977, when he scored what is claimed to be the quickest own goal of all time, scoring after just six seconds of play:

Kruse departed Torquay United in March 1977, having made 79 league appearances and scored four goals during two years at Plainmoor.

Brentford 
Kruse joined Fourth Division strugglers Brentford in March 1977, for what was then a club-record fee for a defender, £20,000. Opinions about the transfer were mixed, as he had been Brentford forward Gordon Sweetzer's marker in his final game for Torquay United, in which Sweetzer had scored a hat-trick. Kruse quickly established himself in the team and made 15 appearances and scoring two goals in what remained of the 1976–77 season He flourished under Bill Dodgin's management and became a stalwart in the Brentford defence for the next four seasons, assuming the captaincy and forming partnerships with other centre backs Paul Shrubb, Nigel Smith and Danis Salman. Kruse averaged 42 appearances a season and helped the club to promotion to the Third Division in the 1977–78 season. His performances during the 1979–80 season won him the club's Player of the Year award.

Kruse was out of favour under new manager Fred Callaghan during the 1981–82 season and made just one appearance before joining Fourth Division strugglers on loan Northampton Town in February 1982. Kruse rejected a potential permanent transfer to the County Ground due to wage concerns. He left Brentford at the end of the season, after making 201 appearances and scored 12 goals in just over five years at Griffin Park.

Barnet 
Kruse dropped into non-League football to sign for Alliance Premier League club Barnet in 1982. He made 31 appearances and scored one goal before retiring at the end of the 1982–83 season. Differences with manager Barry Fry saw Kruse turn his back on the game at age 29.

Personal life 
During his time at Brentford, Kruse commuted to the town from his Midlands home with David McKellar and picked up Jim McNichol and Bob Booker on the way. After retiring from football, Kruse settled in Hitchin and became a builder. He retired in 2022.

Career statistics

Honours 
Brentford
 Football League Fourth Division fourth-place promotion: 1977–78

Individual

 Torquay United Player of the Year: 1975–76
Brentford Supporters' Player of the Year: 1979–80
 Brentford Players' Player of the Year: 1979–80

References

1953 births
Living people
English footballers
Leicester City F.C. players
Mansfield Town F.C. players
Torquay United F.C. players
Brentford F.C. players
Northampton Town F.C. players
English Football League players
People from Arlesey
Arlesey Town F.C. players
Barnet F.C. players
National League (English football) players
Association football central defenders
Footballers from Bedfordshire